The 2001 CFL season is considered to be the 48th season in modern-day Canadian football, although it is officially the 44th Canadian Football League season.

CFL news in 2001
The Canadian Football League were able to get new corporate partnerships who bought into the philosophy of "less is more". Television ratings grew again, especially in the ages 13–34 category, in 2001. TSN saw a ratings growth of 55%, while RDS grew by 116%.

The CFL suspended its Week 11 games in respect to the victims of the September 11 terrorist attacks.

The CFL officially returned to Ottawa when they were guaranteed an expansion franchise on October 16. The ownership group led by Brad Watters unveiled the new franchise as the Ottawa Renegades, and began play the next season. The ownership group were also guaranteed the 92nd annual Grey Cup game in 2004.

About 65,255 fans bought tickets to watch the 89th Grey Cup game at Olympic Stadium in Montreal, making it the second largest attendance draw in CFL history.

The Canadian Football League offices in downtown Toronto moved to Wellington St. East, after having their offices at Eglinton St. for the last 10 years.

Records: Saskatchewan's Paul McCallum broke the record for longest field goal in CFL history by booting a 62-yard field goal against the Edmonton Eskimos on October 27, 2001 in a 12–3 victory at Taylor Field.

The Winnipeg Blue Bombers tied a CFL record by winning 12 consecutive games. 

The 2001 CFL season, along with the 1999 CFL season, would be one of the closest times when an East Division team could have crossed over to the West Division for that division's last playoff spot since the introduction of the crossover in 1997. The Toronto Argonauts had to only win one more game to go 8–10–1, to beat the BC Lions final standings by an overtime loss advantage, or the Lions had to lose a game for the same result. This was settled in the last game of the season for both teams. The opposing team, which was the same team for both, was the Hamilton Tiger-Cats, longtime rivals of Toronto. The Tiger-Cats were defeated by BC, but defeated Toronto, ensuring no crossover. Close wins and losses by both teams against the Saskatchewan Roughriders also played a role in the final standing outcome.

Regular season standings

Final regular season standings
Note: GP = Games Played, W = Wins, L = Losses, T = Ties, OTL = Overtime losses, PF = Points For, PA = Points Against, Pts = Points

Bold text means that they have clinched the playoffs.
Teams losing in overtime are awarded one point.
Edmonton and Winnipeg both have first round byes.

Grey Cup playoffs

The Calgary Stampeders are the 2001 Grey Cup Champions, defeating the heavily-favoured Winnipeg Blue Bombers 27–19 at Montreal's Olympic Stadium. The Calgary Stampeders became the second team in history to have a regular-season losing record to win the Grey Cup. The Stampeders' Marcus Crandell (QB) was named the Grey Cup's Most Valuable Player and Aldi Henry (DB) was the Grey Cup's Most Valuable Canadian.

Playoff bracket

CFL Leaders
 CFL Passing Leaders
 CFL Rushing Leaders
 CFL Receiving Leaders

2001 CFL All-Stars

Offence
QB – Khari Jones, Winnipeg Blue Bombers
RB – Kelvin Anderson, Calgary Stampeders
RB – Michael Jenkins, Toronto Argonauts
SB – Milt Stegall, Winnipeg Blue Bombers
SB – Terry Vaughn, Edmonton Eskimos
WR – Travis Moore, Calgary Stampeders
WR – Ed Hervey, Edmonton Eskimos
C – Bryan Chiu, Montreal Alouettes
OG – Jay McNeil, Calgary Stampeders
OG – Brett MacNeil, Winnipeg Blue Bombers
OT – Bruce Beaton, Edmonton Eskimos
OT – Dave Mudge, Winnipeg Blue Bombers

Defence
DT – Doug Brown, Winnipeg Blue Bombers
DT – Joe Fleming, Calgary Stampeders
DE – Elfrid Payton, Toronto Argonauts
DE – Joe Montford, Hamilton Tiger-Cats
LB – Terry Ray, Edmonton Eskimos
LB – Barrin Simpson, BC Lions
LB – Chris Shelling, Hamilton Tiger-Cats
CB – Eric Carter, BC Lions
CB – Wayne Shaw, Toronto Argonauts
DB – Juran Bolden, Winnipeg Blue Bombers
DB – Harold Nash, Winnipeg Blue Bombers
DS – Rob Hitchcock, Hamilton Tiger-Cats

Special teams
P – Terry Baker, Montreal Alouettes
K – Paul Osbaldiston, Hamilton Tiger-Cats
ST – Charles Roberts, Winnipeg Blue Bombers

2001 Western All-Stars

Offence
QB – Jason Maas, Edmonton Eskimos
RB – Kelvin Anderson, Calgary Stampeders
RB – Darren Davis, Saskatchewan Roughriders
SB – Marc Boerigter, Calgary Stampeders
SB – Terry Vaughn, Edmonton Eskimos
WR – Travis Moore, Calgary Stampeders
WR – Ed Hervey, Edmonton Eskimos
C – Jamie Taras, BC Lions
OG – Jay McNeil, Calgary Stampeders
OG – Andrew Greene, Saskatchewan Roughriders
OT – Bruce Beaton, Edmonton Eskimos
OT – Fred Childress, Calgary Stampeders

Defence
DT – Doug Petersen, Edmonton Eskimos
DT – Joe Fleming, Calgary Stampeders
DE – Herman Smith, BC Lions
DE – Shonte Peoples, Saskatchewan Roughriders
LB – Terry Ray, Edmonton Eskimos
LB – Barrin Simpson, BC Lions
LB – George White, Saskatchewan Roughriders
CB – Eric Carter, BC Lions
CB – Omarr Morgan, Saskatchewan Roughriders
DB – Eddie Davis, Saskatchewan Roughriders
DB – Shannon Garrett, Edmonton Eskimos
DS – Greg Frers, BC Lions

Special teams
P – Sean Fleming, Edmonton Eskimos
K – Sean Fleming, Edmonton Eskimos
ST – Antonio Warren, Calgary Stampeders

2001 Eastern All-Stars

Offence
QB – Khari Jones, Winnipeg Blue Bombers
RB – Mike Pringle, Montreal Alouettes
RB – Michael Jenkins, Toronto Argonauts
SB – Milt Stegall, Winnipeg Blue Bombers
SB – Derrell Mitchell, Toronto Argonauts
WR – Andrew Grigg, Hamilton Tiger-Cats
WR – Ted Alford, Toronto Argonauts
C – Bryan Chiu, Montreal Alouettes
OG – Jude St. John, Toronto Argonauts
OG – Brett MacNeil, Winnipeg Blue Bombers
OT – Dave Hack, Hamilton Tiger-Cats
OT – Dave Mudge, Winnipeg Blue Bombers

Defence
DT – Doug Brown, Winnipeg Blue Bombers
DT – Mike Philbrick, Hamilton Tiger-Cats
DE – Elfrid Payton, Toronto Argonauts
DE – Joe Montford, Hamilton Tiger-Cats
LB – Jason Lamar, Hamilton Tiger-Cats
LB – Sean Woodson, Hamilton Tiger-Cats
LB – Chris Shelling, Hamilton Tiger-Cats
CB – Marvin Coleman, Winnipeg Blue Bombers
CB – Wayne Shaw, Toronto Argonauts
DB – Juran Bolden, Winnipeg Blue Bombers
DB – Harold Nash, Winnipeg Blue Bombers
DS – Rob Hitchcock, Hamilton Tiger-Cats

Special teams
P – Terry Baker, Montreal Alouettes
K – Paul Osbaldiston, Hamilton Tiger-Cats
ST – Charles Roberts, Winnipeg Blue Bombers

2001 Intergold CFLPA All-Stars

Offence
QB – Khari Jones, Winnipeg Blue Bombers
OT – Uzooma Okeke, Montreal Alouettes
OT – Bruce Beaton, Edmonton Eskimos
OG – Andrew Greene, Saskatchewan Roughriders
OG – Steve Hardin, BC Lions
C – Bryan Chiu, Montreal Alouettes
RB – Kelvin Anderson, Calgary Stampeders
FB – Sean Millington, BC Lions
SB – Derrell Mitchell, Toronto Argonauts
SB – Terry Vaughn, Edmonton Eskimos
WR – Milt Stegall, Winnipeg Blue Bombers
WR – Travis Moore, Calgary Stampeders

Defence
DE – Joe Montford, Hamilton Tiger-Cats
DE – Elfrid Payton, Toronto Argonauts
DT – Joe Fleming, Calgary Stampeders
DT – Doug Petersen, Edmonton Eskimos
LB – Terry Ray, Edmonton Eskimos
LB – Alondra Johnson, Calgary Stampeders
LB – Lamar McGriggs, Winnipeg Blue Bombers
CB – Juran Bolden, Winnipeg Blue Bombers
CB – Omarr Morgan, Saskatchewan Roughriders
HB – Harold Nash, Winnipeg Blue Bombers
HB – Ricky Bell, Calgary Stampeders
S – Greg Frers, Calgary Stampeders

Special teams
K – Paul Osbaldiston, Hamilton Tiger-Cats
P – Terry Baker, Montreal Alouettes
ST – Charles Roberts, Winnipeg Blue Bombers

Head coach
 Dave Ritchie, Winnipeg Blue Bombers

2001 CFL Awards
CFL's Most Outstanding Player Award – Khari Jones (QB), Winnipeg Blue Bombers
CFL's Most Outstanding Canadian Award – Doug Brown (DT), Winnipeg Blue Bombers
CFL's Most Outstanding Defensive Player Award – Joe Montford (DE), Hamilton Tiger-Cats
CFL's Most Outstanding Offensive Lineman Award – Dave Mudge (OT), Winnipeg Blue Bombers
CFL's Most Outstanding Rookie Award – Barrin Simpson (LB), BC Lions
CFL's Most Outstanding Special Teams Award – Charles Roberts (RB), Winnipeg Blue Bombers
CFLPA's Outstanding Community Service Award – Rick Walters (SB), Edmonton Eskimos
CFL's Coach of the Year – Dave Ritchie, Winnipeg Blue Bombers
Commissioner's Award - Robert Wetenhall and Larry Smith, Montreal Alouettes

References

2001 in Canadian football
2001